Reptilicus is a 1961 Danish-American giant monster film about a prehistoric reptile. The film was produced by Cinemagic and Saga Studio and separate versions were released in Denmark and in the United States, with American International Pictures handling distribution for the latter.

Filming took place in several locations in Denmark, including Copenhagen, Sjælland, and Jylland. Several versions were filmed. The original was filmed using the native Danish language and the second was filmed using the English language. Each version of the film featured the same actors, with the exception of Bodil Miller, who was replaced by actress Marla Behrens since the Danish actress could not speak English. However, the English version of the film was heavily edited, including altering footage to show Reptilicus vomiting acid venom, and the actors' voices dubbed over by American International Pictures for its release in the United States.

Plot 
Danish miner Svend Viltorft digs up a section of a giant reptile's tail from the frozen grounds in Lapland, where he and other miners are drilling.  The section is flown to the Denmark's Aquarium in Copenhagen, where it is preserved in a cold room for scientific study. But due to careless mishandling, the room is left open and the section begins to thaw, only for scientists to find that it is starting to regenerate.

Professor Otto Martens, who is in charge of the aquarium, dubs the reptilian species "Reptilicus" (upon a reporter's suggestion) and compares its regeneration abilities to that of other animals like starfish.

Once fully regenerated from the tail section, Reptilicus goes on an unstoppable rampage from the Danish countryside to the panic-stricken streets of Copenhagen (including one of its famous landmarks, Langebro Bridge). The monster is finally rendered unconscious by a sedative developed by ingenious scientists and shot into its mouth from a bazooka fired by Gen. Grayson.

However, the film is left open-ended. A final shot shows one of Reptilicus' legs, which had been blown off earlier by the Danish Navy's depth charges, sitting on the sea floor, raising the possibility that it could regenerate into a new Reptilicus.

Cast 
 Carl Ottosen as General Mark Grayson
 Ann Smyrner as Lise Martens
 Mimi Heinrich as Karen Martens
 Asbjørn Andersen as Professor Otto Martens
 Bodil Miller as Connie Miller (Danish version)
 Marla Behrens as Connie Miller (American version)
 Bent Mejding as Svend Viltorft
 Povl Wøldike as Dr. Peter Dalby
 Dirch Passer as Peterson
 Ole Wisborg as Captain Brandt
 Claus Toksvig as himself

Production 
The original Danish-language version was directed by Danish director Poul Bang and released in Denmark on February 25, 1961.

In July, 1960 the American version started production. This version was filmed in English with a nearly identical cast and was directed by the film's American producer-director Sidney W. Pink. Initially, this version was deemed virtually unreleasable by American International Pictures and had to be extensively reworked by the film's Danish-American screenwriter, Ib Melchior, before being finally released in America in 1962. Pink was angry at the changes and wound up in a legal dispute with AIP. After Pink and others viewed the English-language version, however, the lawsuit was dropped.

Praised Danish animators
Pink returned to Hollywood praising Danish animation, saying "Danish miniature work has surpassed that of Japan, up to generally acknowledged to be the finest in the world. Facilities in Denmark, by Hollywood standards, are notably lacking; but fine craftsmen who put everything together by hand are not concerned with the time it takes, (and) are excellent." Pink also said "the Scandinavian countries have never truly been exploited by Hollywood filmmakers, so the settings have remained unusually fresh ground for motion pictures. Reptilicus at Saga Studios in Copenhagen made “at a cost of $380,000, about a third of what it probably would have cost if made in the U. S.".

Release

Theatrical release 
As Denmark's only giant monster film, this film has a cult following in its home country. Sidney Pink attempted to produce a remake of the film in 2001, due to the box office success of Godzilla in 1998, before his death in 2002.

Home video 
The American version of Reptilicus was released on DVD on April 1, 2003, by MGM Home Entertainment under the Midnite Movies banner. The Danish version was released on DVD from Sandrew Metronome in 2002. On June 16, 2015, the film was released in the Blu-ray format by Scream Factory as a double feature with the 1977 film Tentacles.

Reception 

Reptilicus received mostly negative reviews from American critics.

Author and film critic Leonard Maltin awarded the film a BOMB, his lowest rating for a film. In his review on the film Maltin wrote that the film was "only good for laughs as [the] script hits every conceivable monster-movie cliché, right to the final shot."
TV Guide gave the film one out of a possible four stars, calling it "A fair-to-poor monster film".
Matt Brunson from Creative Loafing gave the film a negative review, writing "Awkward dubbing of foreign actors, special effects that look like they cost a buck fifty, laughably earnest dialogue, wince-inducing comic relief from a dim-witted character — if ever a movie was made that deserved to be showcased on the cult series Mystery Science Theater 3000 it's this one."

Novel and comic book adaptations 

A novelization of the film was released in paperback at the time of its original release (Reptilicus by Dean Owen (real name: Dudley Dean McGaughey) (Monarch Books 1961)).

In 1961, Charlton Comics produced a comic book based on the film. Reptilicus lasted two issues. After the copyright had lapsed, Charlton modified the creature's look and renamed it Reptisaurus. The series was renamed Reptisaurus the Terrible and would continue from issue #3 before being cancelled with issue #8 in 1962. This was followed by a one-shot called Reptisaurus Special Edition in 1963. Reptisaurus also made a cameo in the 12th issue of another Charlton giant monster comic, Gorgo.

In 2012, Scary Monsters Magazine reprinted the Reptisaurus the Terrible series as a black and white collection called Scarysaurus the Scary.

In popular culture 
 A clip of the movie was featured in the South Park episode "Cancelled".
 Clips from this movie often appeared on various episodes of the 1960s TV show The Monkees.
 In the Green Acres TV show, season three episode, "Instant Family", this movie was playing at the drive-in theater.
 The movie was featured as the premiere episode for the 2017 revival of Mystery Science Theater 3000.
 Argentinian music group Los Twist composed a song about this movie for their album La máquina del tiempo.
 In the TV show Disenchantment (Season 1, Episode 3), King Zog refers to his wife Oona as Reptilicus.
 In the 1960s TV show The Beverly Hillbillies (Season 5, Episode 3), Jethro double-dates in a sports car to a drive-in movie theater featuring this film.

Notes

References

Further reading 
 Dean Owen: Reptilicus (Monarch Books 1961)
 Sidney W. Pink: So You Want to Make Movies (Pineapple Press 1989)
 Robert Skotak: Ib Melchior – Man of Imagination (Midnight Marquee Press 2000)
 Nicolas Barbano: "Twice Told Tails – The Two Versions of Reptilicus", in Video Watchdog #96 (2003)

External links 

 
 
 Reptilicus original Danish movie trailer at bellabio.dk
 
 

1960s science fiction horror films
1961 horror films
1961 films
Danish-language films
Danish science fiction horror films
Films about dinosaurs
Films about dragons
1960s monster movies
Giant monster films
American multilingual films
American International Pictures films
Films directed by Poul Bang
Films set in Copenhagen
Films shot in Copenhagen
Films set in the Baltic Sea
Kaiju films
American natural horror films
Films adapted into comics
Charlton Comics titles
Comics based on films
American monster movies
American science fiction horror films
Films produced by Sidney W. Pink
Films scored by Sven Gyldmark
Danish multilingual films
1960s multilingual films
Films about father–daughter relationships
1960s English-language films
1960s American films
1960s Japanese films